The Lumleian Lectures are a series of annual lectures started in 1582 by the Royal College of Physicians and currently run by the Lumleian Trust. The name commemorates John Lumley, 1st Baron Lumley, who with Richard Caldwell of the College endowed the lectures, initially confined to surgery, but now on general medicine. William Harvey did not announce his work on the circulation of the blood in the Lumleian Lecture for 1616 although he had some partial notes on the heart and blood which led to the discovery of the circulation ten years later. By that time ambitious plans for a full anatomy course based on weekly lectures had been scaled back to a lecture three times a year.

Initially the appointment of the Lumleian lecturer was for life, later reduced to five years, and since 1825 made annually, although for some years it was awarded for two years in succession.

Lecturers (incomplete list)

1811–1900

1901-2000

2001 onwards
2003 Rodney Phillips, Immunology as taught by Darwin
2004 Michael C. Sheppard, Growth Hormone – from Molecule to Mortality
2005 Steve Bloom, Gut feeling – the secret of satiety
2006 Elwyn Elias, Co-ordinated defence and the liver
2007 Julian Peto, Asbestos and the mesothelioma epidemic
2008 Jeremy J. Farrar, Globalisation and infectious diseases; a threat and an opportunity for collaborative clinical science
2011 Tom Babor, The art of getting science into practice in alcohol treatment – a quoi bon?
2012 Edward R Marcantonio, Intervention studies for delirium: the State of the Science
2013 David Nutt

Notes

British lecture series
Medical lecture series
Royal College of Physicians